Anglesey Mining  is a United Kingdom based mining company. The company is listed on the FTSE Fledgling Index of the London Stock Exchange under the ticker AYM in the mining sector. The company is not currently (as of 2020) carrying out exploration work at its Parys Mountain zinc-copper-lead deposit in North Wales. It reported a loss of £31,000,000 in 2013, but there were positive reports in 2014 when a review of the mineral potential was published.

References

External links 
http://www.angleseymining.co.uk/

Companies listed on the London Stock Exchange
Mining companies of the United Kingdom
Economy of Anglesey
Mining in Wales